Richard White (1590 – 1682) was an English mathematician and physicist.

A Catholic from Essex, he studied under Benedetto Castelli in Pisa and lived mostly in Italy. In the preface of his book Hemisphaerium Dissectum, printed in Rome with the Inquisition's permission, he wrote with great admiration of Galileo Galilei. He also had with Galileo a friendly correspondence by letter.

Works

References 

1590 births
1682 deaths
Mathematicians from the Kingdom of England
Expatriates of the Kingdom of England in Italy
English physicists